The women's heptathlon event at the 2007 European Athletics U23 Championships was held in Debrecen, Hungary, at Gyulai István Atlétikai Stadion on 14 and 15 July.

Medalists

Results

Final
14-15 July

Participation
According to an unofficial count, 19 athletes from 14 countries participated in the event.

 (1)
 (3)
 (3)
 (1)
 (1)
 (1)
 (2)
 (1)
 (1)
 (1)
 (1)
 (1)
 (1)
 (1)

References

Heptathlon
Combined events at the European Athletics U23 Championships